Zarin may refer to:
Zarin (comics), a comic book character
Zarin, Iran, a village in Kerman Province, Iran
Zarin-e Olya, a village in East Azerbaijan Province, Iran
Zarin-e Sofla, a village in East Azerbaijan Province, Iran
Zarin Mehta (born 1938), Canadian philanthropist 
 (1875–1935), Russian theologian

See also
Zariņš, a surname
Zarrin (disambiguation)